The Pongo de Mainique ('gate' in Quechua) is a water gap (canyon) of the Urubamba River in Peru.

The Pongo de Mainique is the only break in the Vilcabamba mountain range. It also divides the Urubamba River (a headwater of the Amazon River) between the turbulent Upper Urubamba and the more placid Lower Urubamba. It is considered the most dangerous whitewater pass on the Urubamba; however, many boats traverse it, depending on seasonal river conditions. According to legend, the river was once crossed by the so-called Inca Bridge, although the Pongo was outside the boundaries of the Inca Empire. The bridge no longer exists.

The Pongo de Mainique is a global biodiversity hotspot. According to the Wildlife Conservation Society, "the lowland rainforests and mid-montane cloud forests within a radius of five miles (8 km) of the Pongo possibly comprise the single most biologically-diverse site on the face of the Earth."

The rapids of the Pongo de Mainique were used as a filming location for key scenes of Werner Herzog's 1982 film Fitzcarraldo starring Klaus Kinski.
In a 2006 survey of "15 of the world's top travel writers" by The Observer, Monty Python actor and BBC travel documentarist Michael Palin named it his "favourite place in the world".

References

External links

 Pictures and text

  – Click "Next page" for two more screens.

 Pictures

 – Pictures of the Pongo de Mainique (4th to 8th)

Canyons and gorges of Peru
Landforms of Cusco Region
Water gaps